Naomi Ruike is a Japanese freestyle wrestler. She won the gold medal in the women's 65kg event at the 2020 Asian Wrestling Championships held in New Delhi, India. A year earlier she won the silver medal in this event.

In 2019, she competed in the women's freestyle 65kg event at the World Wrestling Championships held in Nur-Sultan, Kazakhstan. She was eliminated in her first match by Wang Xiaoqian of China. Wang went on to win one of the bronze medals.

References

External links 
 

Living people
Year of birth missing (living people)
Place of birth missing (living people)
Japanese female sport wrestlers
Asian Wrestling Championships medalists
21st-century Japanese women